Sharon Mosher is an American geologist. She did her undergraduate work at University of Illinois Urbana-Champaign.  After earning an MSc from Brown University, she returned to the University of Illinois to get her PhD in Geology in 1978. Since 2001 she has held the William Stamps Farish Chair at University of Texas, and, since 2009 she has served as the dean of the Jackson School of Geosciences at Texas. In 2013 she became the president of the American Geosciences Institute.

She was a founder of GeoScienceWorld, an international journal aggregation for geoscientists. Among her awards and honors, she is a fellow of the Geological Society of America, from which she received the Distinguished Service Award in 2003, after serving as its president in 2001, and an honorary fellow of the Geological Society of London. In 1990 she was named Outstanding Educator by the Association for Women Geoscientists. In 2020 she was acknowledged as the Marcus Milling Legendary Geoscientist.

Research 
Her primary research interests are in the evolution of complexly deformed terranes, strain analysis, deformation mechanisms, and the interaction between chemical and physical processes during deformation.

Mosher's research involves structural petrology and field-oriented structural geology. She created and tested a new model for the collisional orogen along the southern margin of Laurentia, with specific emphasis on the Sierra Diablo foothills of west Texas and the Llano uplift of central Texas. Shifting focus to her work in the examination of mesoproterozoic plate tectonics, Dr. Mosher has made great advancements in the study of plate tectonics and has changed the way of thinking of many in this field. Traditionally, mesoproterozoic mountain belts have been thought of as having a lack of ophiolites, high and ultra high pressure rocks but through her research Dr. Mosher has proven this not to be the case. This was done through the study of modern day high pressure metamorphism, subduction and collision of different crustal levels in the southern margin of the Laurentia and comparing them to current knowledge of tectonic evolution in the mesoproterozoic era. She also studied the evolution of the Macquarie Ridge Complex, the Pacific-Australian plate boundary south of New Zealand, exploring how strain was divided during the boundary’s evolution, the processes that allowed the deformation, and the discontinuation of magmatism. Macquarie ridge is unique as these sediments are easily accessible and therefore easy to study. Through this research Dr. Mosher has discovered that the active tectonic environment is primarily made of breccia, sandstone and siltstone turbidity-current generated debris fans and that faulting, sedimentation and volcanism are merely a small part of plate boundaries. Another of her research projects focused on the partitioning of different types of strain during formation of ductile non-coaxial shear zones in both extensional and contractional environments, including the development of corrugations in metamorphic core complexes and the formation of rods and mullions in thrust nappes.

Academic experience 
Mosher is currently a professor at the Jackson School of Geosciences at the University of Texas at Austin, and has been a faculty member at the University of Texas since 1978. She has been a full time professor specializing in structural geology, structural petrology and tectonics since 1990, teaching students at both the undergraduate and graduate level and has supervised 19 PhD students and 35 MS students. She has 33 years of field and mapping experience, and was a Field Camp director for 15 years.

Personal life 
As a child in Illinois, Sharon Mosher was fascinated by geology, conducting mineral tests on rocks in the chemistry lab her dad set up for her in their basement. She decided she wanted to be a geologist the moment she learned that's what you'd call a person who studies rocks.

Mosher’s father would take her as a child on Illinois State Geological Survey field trips, and whenever her family went on their annual vacation, Mosher would map the route, figuring out stops where she and her older sister could find rocks. Today, Mosher still hunts for rocks and maps out routes—only she is now mapping future paths for the acclaimed Jackson School of Geosciences at the University of Texas at Austin. Since 2009, she has been Dean of the school, the largest geosciences academic institution in the country, however she was replaced as dean by Claudia Mora in February 2020. Mosher is also known worldwide for her research on mountain formation millions of years ago when continents collided. She brought new life to two major geological associations, and helped spearhead a national initiative to evaluate what undergraduate students in geosciences across the country need to know. As the president of the GSA (2000-2001), Mosher was interviewed in April, 2001 by the Geotimes. Mosher displayed a willingness to allow for technological access of electronic publications easily accessible to those that wanted to research geological studies. This could spark the interest of many to get involved with the science of geology. By using programs such as Earthscope, researchers could freely answer vast quantities of questions regarding tectonic plates.

Publications  
“Ridge reorientation mechanisms: Macquarie Ridge Complex, Australia-Pacific plate boundary”

“Paleoenvironmental and tectonic controls of sedimentation in coal-forming basins of southeastern New England”

“Structural and tectonic evolution of Mesozoic basement-involved fold nappes and thrust faults in the Dome Rock Mountains, Arizona”

“Tectonic evolution of the eastern Llano uplift, central Texas: A record of Grenville orogenesis along the southern Laurentian margin”

“Tectonic evolution of the southern Laurentian Grenville orogenic belt”

“Laurentia‐Kalahari Collision and the Assembly of Rodinia”

“Kinematic history of the Narragansett Basin, Massachusetts and Rhode Island: Constraints on Late Paleozoic plate reconstructions”

Achievements and awards 
Mosher has made several accomplishments within her academic career and has received multiple awards for her contributions to geology.

1990 - "Association of Women Geologists Outstanding Educator Award". Mosher received this award for her educational contributions and high-quality research in geoscience as a professor in the Department of Geological Sciences at the University of Texas.

2000-2001 - President of Geology Society of America (GSA)

2003 - "GSA Distinguished Service Award". Received this award for her major involvement and development of GSA.

2004 - Chair of the Council of Scientific Society Presidents

2007-2009 - Chair of Department of Geological Sciences at University of Texas

2012-2013 - American Geoscience Institute President (AGI)

2016 - Alumni Achievement Award from the University of Illinois at Champaign/Urbana Liberal Arts College, her alma mater (University of Illinois).

2020 - Marcus Milling Legendary Geoscientist. Lifetime achievement awarded to Sharon Mosher for all her achievements in Earth Sciences.

Service 

-         Past Chair, Council of Scientific Society Presidents, (2005)

-         Chair, Board of Directors, Geoscience World Board (2004-2006)

-         Member, Advisory Board, GEON (2004-2007)

-         Chair, Council of Scientific Society Presidents (2004)

-         Chair-Elect, Council of Scientific Society Presidents (2003)

-         Board Member, Council of Scientific Society Presidents (2001)

-         President, Geological Society of America (2000 - 2001)

-         Ex- Officio, Member of all 21 GSA Committees, Geological Society of America (2000 - 2001)

-         Vice President, Geological Society of America (1999 - 2000)

-         Chairman, Committee of Young Scientist Award, Geological Society of America (1993)

-         Councilor, Geological Society of America (1992 - 1995)

-         Ex-Official Member, U.S. National Committee, Geology (1991 - 1993)

-         Chairman, Undergraduate Curriculum Review Committee, (1990 - 1995)

-         Vice-Chairman, U.S. National Committee, International Geologic Correlation Program (1987 - 1990)

-         Chairman, Division of Structural Geology and Tectonics, Geological Society of America (1981 - 1982)

References

Living people
American women geologists
Fellows of the Geological Society of America
Brown University alumni
University of Illinois Urbana-Champaign alumni
University of Texas at Austin faculty
20th-century American geologists
21st-century American geologists
21st-century American scientists
20th-century American women scientists
21st-century American women scientists
Year of birth missing (living people)
Presidents of the Geological Society of America
American women academics
Women geologists